Cartography is the study of map making and cartographers are map makers.

Before 1400

Anaximander, Greek Anatolia (610 BC–546 BC), first to attempt making a map of the known world
Hecataeus of Miletus, Greek Anatolia (550 BC–476 BC), geographer, cartographer, and early ethnographer
Dicaearchus, Greece (c. 350 BC–285 BC), philosopher, cartographer, geographer, mathematician, author
Ende, Spain (c. 1000 AD), illustrator, cartographer, nun
Eratosthenes, Ptolemaic Egypt (276 BC–194 BC), Greek scientist, mathematician, geographer, and cartographer
Gyōki, Japan (668–749) Buddhist monk, cartographer, surveyor, and civil engineer,
Hipparchus, Greece (190 BC–120 BC), astronomer, cartographer, geographer
Liu An, China (179 BC–122 BC), geographer, cartographer, author of the Huainanzi
Marinus of Tyre, Roman Syria (c. AD 70–130), Greek geographer, cartographer and mathematician, who founded mathematical geography
Ptolemy, Ptolemaic Egypt (c. 85–165), Greek astronomer, cartographer, and geographer
Pei Xiu (224–271), Chinese geographer and cartographer
Isidore of Seville, Hispania (560–636)
al-Khwārazmī, Caliphate (9th century), Persian cartographer, geographer, and polymath.
Su Song, China (1020–1101), horologist and engineer; as a Song dynasty diplomat, he used his knowledge of cartography and map-making to solve territorial border disputes with the rival Liao dynasty
Shen Kuo, China (1031–1095), polymath scientist and statesman, author of the Dream Pool Essays, which included a large atlas of China and foreign regions, and also made a three-dimensional raised-relief map
al-Idrisi, Sicily (1100–1166), Arab cartographer, geographer and traveller
Maximus Planudes, Byzantine Empire (13th century), a monk credited with restoring the texts and maps of Ptolemy
Petrus Vesconte, Genoese cartographer, author of the oldest signed Portolan chart (1311)
Angelino Dulcert (14th century), author of the earliest known Majorcan portolan charts of the Mediterranean

15th century

Jacobus Angelus, Florence, translated Ptolemy into Latin 
Martin Behaim (Germany, 1436–1507)
Benedetto Bordone (Venetian Republic (1460–1551)
Sebastian Cabot (1476–1557), Venetian explorer
Erhard Etzlaub (1460–1532)
Leonardo da Vinci (Italy, 1452–1519)
Henricus Martellus Germanus (Germany, fl. 1480–1496)
Donnus Nicholas Germanus (Germany, fl. 1460–1475)
Fra Mauro (Venice, c. 1459)
Piri Reis (Dardanelles, Ottoman Empire, 1465–1554/1555)
Johannes Ruysch (Netherlands, c 1466–1530), explorer, cartographer, astronomer, manuscript illustrator and painter
Hartmann Schedel (Germany, 1440–1514)
Amerigo Vespucci (Republic of Florence, 1454–1512)
Johannes Werner (Germany, 1466–1528), refined and promoted the Werner map projection
Martin Waldseemüller (Germany, c. 1470–c. 1521/1522)
Olaus Magnus (Olof Månsson) (Sweden, 1490 -1557) published Carta Marina in 1539 
Gabriel de Valseca (15th century), Majorcan, author of several portolan charts of the Mediterranean
 (15th century), from Ancona, author of several portolan charts of the Mediterranean

16th century

Giovanni Battista Agnese (c. 1500–1564), Genoese, cartographer, author of numerous nautical atlases
Hacı Ahmet, Tunisian cartographer, translated 16th c. map into Turkish for the Ottoman Empire.
Peter Apian (1495–1552), also known as Peter Bienewitz, German geographer and astronomer, author of the Apianus projection
Philipp Apian (1531–1589)
Joost Janszoon Bilhamer (Netherlands, 1541–1590)
Hernando de los Ríos Coronel (1559–1621?) cosmographer and cartographer, mapped Taiwan (Isla Hermosa), Luzon and part of the Chinese coast.
Willem Janszoon Blaeu (Netherlands, 1571–1638), father of Joan Blaeu
Giovanni Battista Boazio, mapped Sir Francis Drake's voyage to the West Indies and America
Jacob Roelofs van Deventer (Netherlands, c 1510/15–1575)
Fernão Vaz Dourado (India, c. 1520–c. 1580), Portuguese cartographer of the school initiated by Lopo Homem
Oronce Finé (France, 1494–1555)
Gemma Frisius (or Reiner Gemma) (Netherlands, 1508–1555)
Jan Van Hanswijk (Netherlands, fl. 1594)
Martin Helwig (Germany, 1516–1574)
Augustin Hirschvogel (Germany, 1503–1553)
Lopo Homem (Portugal?–1565), co-author, with the Reinel family, of the well-known Miller Atlas
Diogo Homem (Portugal 1521–1576), cartographer, son of Lopo Homem
Jodocus Hondius (Netherlands, 1563–1612)
Johannes Honterus (Transylvania, 1498–1549)
Gerard de Jode (Netherlands, 1509–1591)
Urbano Monti (Italy, 1544–1613)
Jacques le Moyne (France, ca. 1533–1588)
Guillaume Le Testu (France, ca. 1509–1573)
Jacobus Pentius de Leucho (Italy)
Gerardus Mercator (Netherlands, 1512–1594)
Sebastian Münster (Germany, 1488–1552)
Abraham Ortelius (France, 1527–1598), generally recognized as the creator of the first modern atlas
Petrus Plancius (Netherlands, 1552–1622)
Timothy Pont (Scotland, 1565–1614)
Pedro Reinel (Portugal ?–c. 1542), author of the oldest signed Portuguese nautical chart
Jorge Reinel (Portugal c. 1502–c. 1572), Portuguese cartographer, son of Pedro Reinel
Diogo Ribeiro (Portugal, ?–Sevilha, 1533), author of the first known planisphere with a graduated Equator (1527)
Sebastião Lopes (Portugal 16th century), Portuguese cartographer and cosmographer
Christopher Saxton (England, born c 1540)
John Speed (England, 1542–1629)
Fernando Álvares Seco (Portugal?–?), signed the oldest known map of Portugal, reproduced in various editions of Abraham Ortelius's Theatrum Orbis Terrarum
Bernardus Sylvanus (Italy)
Luís Teixeira (Portugal ?–?), author of an important atlas of Brazil
Bartolomeu Velho (Portugal ?–1568), cosmographer and cartographer
Lucas Janszoon Waghenaer (Netherlands, 1533/34–1605/06), driver, cartographer
Edward Wright (mathematician) (England, 1561–1615), mathematician and cartographer
Georg Braun (Germany, 1541–1622), cartographer

17th century

Pieter van der Aa (Netherlands, 1659–1733)
João Teixeira Albernaz I (Portugal, died c. 1664), prolific cartographer, son of Luís Teixeira
João Teixeira Albernaz II (Portugal, died c. 1699), Portuguese cartographer
Pedro Teixeira Albernaz (Portugal, c. 1595–1662), Portuguese cartographer author of an important atlas of the Iberian Peninsula and a map of Portugal (1656)
Guillaume Le Vasseur de Beauplan (France, c. 1600–1673), French cartographer who created first descriptive map of Ukraine
Johannes Blaeu (Netherlands, 1596–1673)
Emanuel Bowen (1693/4–1767), engraver and map maker
Vincenzo Coronelli (Venetian, 1650–1718)
Guillaume Delisle (French, 1675–1726)
Petter Gedda (Sweden, 1661–1697)
Hessel Gerritsz (Netherlands, 1581–1632), cartographer for the VOC
Isaak de Graaff (Netherlands, 1668–1743), cartographer for the VOC
Johann Homann (Germany, 1664–1724), geographer
Henricus Hondius (Netherlands, 1597–1651)
Willem Hondius (Netherlands, 1598–1652/58)
Johannes Janssonius (Netherlands, 1588–1664)
Johannes van Keulen (Netherlands, 1654–1715)
Joannes de Laet (Netherlands, 1581–1649)
Michael van Langren (Netherlands, 1600–1675)
Alain Manesson Mallet (France, 1630–1706)
Matthäus Merian Sr. (Switzerland, 1593–1650) and Jr. (Switzerland, 1621–1687)
David de Meyne (Netherlands, ca. 1569–1620)
Herman Moll (Germany?/England, 1654–1732)
Robert Morden (England, 1650–1703)
Giovan Battista Nicolosi (Italy, 1610–1670)
Dirck Rembrantsz van Nierop (Netherlands, 1610–1682), cartographer, mathematician and astronomist
Jean-Baptiste Nolin (France, c.1657–1708)
John Ogilby (Scotland, 1600–1676)
 (England, 16xx-1743)
Nicolas Sanson (France, 1600–1667)
Peter Schenk the Elder (Germany, 1660–1718/19)
Johannes Vingboons (Netherlands, 1616/17–1670), cartographer and aquarellist
Georg Matthäus Vischer (Austria, 1628–1696), cartographer, topographer and engraver
Claes Jansz Visscher (Netherlands, 1587–1652)
Nicolaes Visscher I (Netherlands, 1618–1679)
Frederik de Wit (Netherlands, 1610/16–1698)
Nicolaes Witsen (Netherlands, 1641–1717), diplomat, cartographer, writer and mayor of Amsterdam
Giovanni Cassini ( Cassini I, Italy & France, 1625–1712)
Jacques Cassini (a.k.a. Cassini II, France, 1677–1756)

18th century

John James Abert (United States, 1788–1863), headed the Corps of Topographical Engineers for 32 years and organized the mapping of the American West
John Arrowsmith (England, 1790–1873), member of the Arrowsmith family of geographers
Louis Albert Guislain Bacler d'Albe (France, 1761–1824), also artist and longtime strategic advisor to Napoleon
John Senex (1690–1740), engraver, publisher, surveyor and geographer to Queen Anne
John Lodge Cowley, cartographer, mathematician and geographer
Agostino Codazzi (Italy, 1793–1858)
 Joseph Frederick Wallet DesBarres (1721–1824), created Atlantic Neptune
Giambattista (Giovanni Battista) Albrizzi (Venice, 1698–1777), publisher of illustrated books and maps
Sieur le Rouge map c1740
John Gibson (cartographer), map c. 1758
Jacques-Nicolas Bellin (1703–1772), chief cartographer to the French navy
William Bligh (England, 1754–57 December 1817), Ships Master during the infamous Bounty mutiny and noted free-hand cartographer
Rigobert Bonne (France, 1727–1795), Royal Cartographer to France in the office of the Hydrographer at Depot de la Marine
Jean Baptiste Bourguignon d'Anville (France, 1697–1782)
Don Tomas Lopez de Vargas Machuca (Spain, 1730–1802)
Lourenco Homem da Cunha d’Eca, created , 1808
Abel Buell (1742–1822), published the first map of the new United States created by an American
Dimitrie Cantemir (Moldavia and Russia, 1673–1723)
César-François Cassini de Thury (a.k.a. Cassini III, France, 1714–1784)
Jean-Dominique Cassini (a.k.a. Cassini IV, France, 1748–1845)
Edme Mentelle (France, 1730–1816)
Pierre Gilles Chanlair (France, 1758–1817)
James Cook (Captain RN) (1728–1779), navigator and naval chart maker
Simeon De Witt (1756–1834), successor to Robert Erskine and Surveyor-General of the State of New York
Louis Isidore Duperrey (French, 1786–1865)
Johann Friedrich Endersch (Germany, fl. 1755)
Colonel Robert Erskine (1735–1780), geographer and Surveyor-General of the Continental Army during the American Revolution
Joseph de Ferraris (1726–1814), Austrian cartographer of the Austrian Netherlands
Matthew Flinders (British, 1774–1814), Royal Navy officer; circumnavigated Australia and made exploration of the Australian coastline
Joseph Marx Baron von Liechtenstern (Austria, 1765–1828)
Louis Feuillée (France, 1660–1732)
Björn Gunnlaugsson (Iceland, 1788–1876)
Fielding Lucas, Jr. (c. 1781–1854), of the Lucas Brothers, Baltimore, USA
J. Flyn "New and Correct Plan of London", 1770
Samuel Gustaf Hermelin (Sweden, 1744–1820)
Thomas Jefferys (England, c. 1710–1771), geographer of King George III of the United Kingdom
William Faden (England, 1749–1836), successor to Thomas Jefferys
Pierre Jacotin (France, 1765–1829)
Murdoch McKenzie (Scotland, died 1797)
John Mitchell (1711–1768), colonial British American mapmaker
Thomas Livingstone Mitchell (England, 1792–1855)
Robert Moresby (England, 1794–1863)
Thomas Moule (England, 1784–1851)
Carlton Osgood (United States, †1816)
Adriaan Reland (Netherlands, 1676–1718), linguist and cartographer
Thomas Richardson (Scotland)
Dider Robert de Vaugondy (France, 1688–1766)
John Rocque (England, 1709–1762)
David Watson, surveyed Scotland post 1747 to produce The Duke of Cumberland's Map
William Roy (England, 1726–1790)
William Mudge (England, 1762–1820)
Thomas Frederick Colby (England, 1784–1852)
Matthäus Seutter (Germany, 1678–1757)
Friedrich Wilhelm Carl von Schmettau (1743–1806)
Matthias Seutter (Germany, 1678–1757)
Jacob Swart (Netherlands, 1796–1866)
Inō Tadataka (Japan, 1745–1818) Surveyor and cartographer who completed the first surveyed map of Japan
David Thompson (British–Canadian, 1770–1857)
Daniel-Charles Trudaine (France, 1703–1769)
Philip Johan von Strahlenberg (1676–1747)
Thomas Kitchin (1718–1784), London-based cartographer and engraver of maps of England, greater Europe, and parts of the British Empire.; at one time held the titles "Senior Hydrographer to His Majesty" and "Senior Engraver to His Royal Highness the Duke of York"
Friedrich Christoph Müller (Germany, 1751–1808)
Philippe Vandermaelen (Belgium, 1795–1869)
Alexander Wilbrecht (Russia, 1757–1823), geographer of the Geographic Department of the Cabinet of Her Imperial Majesty
Emma Willard (United States, 1787–1870), women's rights activist and education reformer
James Wilson (United States, 1763–1835), first maker of globes in the United States
George Washington (United States of America, 1732–1799), first president of the United States; cartographer
Henri Michelot (France, born c. 1664), Marseilles, France, hydrographer and pilot of the Royal Galley

19th century

Robert Aitken of Beith. born c. 1786
 Carlo de Candia (1803–1862), Italian cartographer, created the large maritime map of Sardinia in 1: 250,000 scale, travel version.
John Bartholomew the elder(26 April 1805 – 8 April 1861), Scottish cartographer and engraver.
Henry Peter Bosse (Germany/United States, 1844–1903), also photographer and civil engineer
Abraham Bradley Jr. (1767–1838), created first postal road maps of the United States
George Bradshaw (England, 1801–1853)
Eugenia Wheeler Goff (United States, 1844–1922), combined history, resources, and geography
Leslie George Bullock (1895–1971)
Bernard J. S. Cahill (1867–1944), inventor of octahedral "Butterfly Map" of the world
George Comer (1858–1937)
John Paul Goode (1862–1932), created the "Evil Mercator" and Goode’s World Atlas
Hermann Haack (Germany, 1872–1966)
Eduard Imhof (1895–1986), oversaw the Schweizerischer Mittelschulatlas, the atlas used in Swiss
James Ireland Craig (1868–1952), inventor of the Craig retroazimuthal projection, otherwise known as the Mecca projection
J. H. Colton (United States, 1800–1893)
Carl Diercke (1842–1913)
Max Eckert-Greifendorff (Germany, 1868–1938)
Percy Fawcett (1867–1925), British explorer of South America
Matthew Fontaine Maury (United States, 1806–1873), U.S. Navy officer; also oceanographer, meteorologist, cartographer, author, geologist, and educator
Matsuura Takeshirō (Japan, 1818–1888) explorer, cartographer, writer, painter, priest, and antiquarian.
Thaddeus Mortimer Fowler (1842–1922), American producer of pictorial maps
Charles F. Hoffmann (Germany/United States, 1838–1913)
James Gardner
William Hughes (geographer) FRGS (1818 – 21 May 1876) was an English geographer, mapmaker, cartographer and author.
Gwynneth de Candia Vaughan (England 1879 - ?), British cartographer, mapmaker in the Australian territories.
Felix Jones (England, 1813–1878)
Florence Kelley (United States, 1859–1932), political reformer, director of the Chicago portion of the Hull House Maps and Papers
Peter Kozler (Slovenia, 1824–1879), lawyer, geographer, politician, manufacturer
 Rudolf Leuzinger (Switzerland, 1826-1896), known for mountain landscapes and geologic forms and the first to produce terrain maps in color lithography. 
Victor Adolphe Malte-Brun (France, 1816–1889)
Heinrich Theodor Menke (Germany, 1819–1892)
August Heinrich Petermann (18 April 1822 – 25 September 1878), German cartographer
George Philip (1800–1882), cartographer, map publisher and founder of the publishing house George Philip & Son Ltd. 
Erwin Raisz (1893–1968)
William Schmollinger (fl. 1830s)
William R. Shepherd (1871–1934)
Yuly Shokalsky (Russia, 1856–1940), also oceanographer and geographer
Karl Spruner von Merz (Germany, 1803–1892)
John Tallis and Company (England, 1838–1851)
Nicolas Auguste Tissot (France, 1824–1897), devised Tissot's indicatrix
Shanawdithit (Canada, ca. 1801–1829), created maps depicting the movement Beothuk people in Newfoundland
Edward A. Vincent (England/United States, c. 1825–27 November 1856), cartographer, civil engineer, architect
Nain Singh Rawat (India, 1830–1882) Cartographer and explorer
Cope, Emmor B: Gettysburg Battlefield cartographer and first Gettysburg National Military Park superintendent
Alexandre Vuillemin (France, 1812–1880)
Ruth Taylor White (United States 1899 – ?), creator of pictorial maps of the United States
John Francon Williams FRGS (1854–4 September 1911), editor, journalist, writer, geographer, historian, cartographer and inventor.
Fanny Bullock Workman (United States, 1859–1925), geographer, cartographer, explorer, travel writer, and mountaineer
James Wyld (England, 1812–1887)
Hatsusaburō Yoshida (Japan, 1884–1955)

20th century

Regina Araújo de Almeida (Brazil, 1949– ), professor of geography at the University of Sao Paulo, tactile cartographer
Jacques Bertin (France, 1918–2010)
Josef Breu (Austria, 1914–1998)
Cynthia Brewer (United States, 1957– ), developed ColorBrewer, professor at Penn State University
Roger Brunet (1931– )
Emanuela Casti (1950– ), formalized a semiotic theory of geographic maps
Danny Dorling (1968– ), developed circular cartograms
Marion A. Frieswyk (United States, 1922–2021), first female intelligence cartographer in the Central Intelligence Agency
Emily Garfield, (1987– ), cartographic artist
Günther Hake (1922–2000)
Richard Edes Harrison (1901–1994)
Tom Harrisson (1911–1976)
George F. Jenks (1916–1996)
Elrey Borge Jeppesen (1907–1996)
Ingrid Kretschmer (1939–2011)
Toy Lasker (United States, 1919–2011), creator and editor of Flashmaps guidebooks
Edgar Lehmann (1905–1990)
Kate McLean (United Kingdom) Best known for creating olfactory maps of cities
Jess Miller (United States, 1988– ), artist, photographer, and cartographer of rural Arkansas
Mark Monmonier (United States, 1943– ), wrote How to Lie with Maps and created the Monmonier Algorithm. Distinguished Professor Emeritus, Syracuse University
Mark Newman (1968– ), developed area contiguous cartograms using a diffusion-based method
Ruth Rhoads Lepper Gardner (United States, 1905–2011), cartographer of the Maine coast
Rudi Ogrissek (1926–1999)
Rafael Palacios (1905–1993), prolific map-drawer for major US publishers
Phyllis Pearsall (England, 1906–1996), creator of the Geographers' A–Z Street Atlas
Barbara Petchenik (1939–1992), first woman to serve as Vice President of the International Cartographic Association
Arthur H. Robinson (1915–2004), wrote the influential textbook Elements of Cartography and developed the Robinson projection
Abbas Sahab (1921–2000), Iranian cartographer, produced the first atlas of the Persian Gulf
Paula Scher (United States, 1948– ), graphic designer, painter
Joni Seagar (United States 1954– ), professor of geography at the University of Vermont
Nikolas Schiller (1980– ), Arabesque maps composed of kaleidoscopic aerial photographs
John C. Sherman (1916–1996)
Jessamine Shumate (1902–1990)
Kira B. Shingareva (Russia, 1938–2013), first person to successfully map the dark side of the moon
John P. Snyder (1926–1997), developed the space oblique mercator projection
Dr. E. Lee Spence (1947– ), pioneer underwater archaeologist, decorative, historical maps showing shipwreck locations
Marie Tharp (1920–2006), oceanographic cartographer
Norman J. W. Thrower (1919–2002) professor at UCLA and author who was known for work in geography, surveying practices, and history
Waldo R. Tobler (1930–2018), developed the first law of geography
Judith Tyner (United States, 1939– ), professor emerita of geography at California State University, Long Beach
Ludwig von der Vecht (Deutschland, 1854–1919), cartographer of German colonies 
Bradford Washburn (1910–2007)
Denis Wood (United States, 1945– ), artist, author, and former professor of design at North Carolina State University
David Woodward (1942–2004)

See also

History of cartography
List of geographers
Ancient world maps
Russian cartographers
:Category:Cartography organizations
:Category:Historians of cartography

References

Cartographers
 List of Cartographers